Rose S. Zetzer (January 13, 1904April 5, 1998) was an American lawyer. She was the first woman to gain admission to the Maryland bar and the founder of Maryland's first all-female law firm.

Early life and education 
Zetzer was born in East Baltimore, Maryland in 1904, to Russian immigrants Jacob, a butcher and Balia Zetzer. She was the eldest of three siblings. Her decision to become an attorney came after a discussion in the 8th grade about whether women should have the right to vote. She attended Eastern High School, where she was trained as a stenographer, and received her undergraduate degree from Johns Hopkins University. She then pursued a law degree from University of Maryland Law School and began practicing law immediately after her graduation in 1925.

Career
Zetzer's first client paid her in candy, the second in "hose" due to a societal reluctance to give women money. She first attempted to join the bar in 1927, but was repeatedly rejected due to her sex. She was finally admitted in 1946, becoming the bar's first female member 21 years after she had begun practicing law.
Zetzer was the president of the Women's Bar Association and vice-president of the National Association of Women Lawyers.  She, along with Jeanette Wolman would march with the Suffragettes.

In 1940 Zetzer formed Maryland's first all female law-firm, Zetzer, Carton, Friedler & Parke.

Until 1947, women could not serve on juries in Baltimore City due to the lack of bathrooms. Zetzer's work resulted in passing a partial women's jury service bill through the Maryland General Assembly.

A Jewish woman, Zetzer applied to become the first female assistant in the State's attorney's office of Baltimore City in the 1950s, but was ultimately denied the position "as a matter of religion".

Later life and death
Zetzer was inducted into the Baltimore City Hall of Fame in 1990. She retired in the early 1990s, and died of heart failure on April 5, 1998. The University of Maryland Law School established a fellowship in her honor.

References 

University of Maryland Francis King Carey School of Law alumni
Johns Hopkins University alumni
Maryland lawyers
Lawyers from Baltimore
20th-century American women lawyers
20th-century American lawyers
American people of Russian-Jewish descent